Tinashe Samuel Mutanga (born 27 January 1993) is a Zimbabwean sprinter who specialises in the 100 metres.

Mutanga won a silver medal in the 100 metres at the 2011 African Junior Athletics Championships in Gaborone, Botswana. He also won the 100 m and 200 m at the Africa Youth Games in 2010.

At the inaugural 2010 Summer Youth Olympics, he finished sixth in the 100 metres and fourth in the medley relay.

References

External links

1993 births
Living people
Alumni of Eaglesvale High School
Zimbabwean male sprinters
Athletes (track and field) at the 2010 Summer Youth Olympics